Elections were held in the Australian state of Queensland on 22 October 1983 to elect the 82 members of the state's Legislative Assembly.

The election resulted in a sixth consecutive term of office for the National Party under Joh Bjelke-Petersen. It was the tenth election win for the National Party in Queensland since it first came to office in 1957.

Background

The election was triggered when a number of Liberal MLAs, including Welfare Services Minister Terry White, crossed the floor of the Parliament to support a Labor motion to create an Expenditure Review Committee. White was sacked from cabinet for supporting the motion.  In response, he launched a party-room coup against Liberal leader and deputy premier Llewellyn Edwards and became Liberal leader with Angus Innes as his deputy.

In the normal course of events, White would have succeeded Edwards as deputy premier.  However, White and Innes' progressive leanings didn't sit well with Bjelke-Petersen, and he refused to make White deputy premier.  In response, White tore up the Coalition agreement and led the Liberals to the crossbench.  However, Bjelke-Petersen prorogued Parliament ahead of the election, allowing him to govern for nine weeks without fear of being toppled on the floor of the legislature.

Labor, under the leadership of new leader Keith Wright, hoped to make use of the division between the conservative parties to make gains, while the Liberals hoped to win enough seats to force the Nationals back into Coalition under more favourable terms. The Nationals sought to gain enough seats to form a majority government in their own right.  Indeed, Bjelke-Petersen directed his campaign mainly at right-leaning Liberal voters, suggesting that the alternative was a Labor government propped up by White's Liberals.

Key dates

Results

The Nationals were returned to office, one seat short of a majority. Labor also made gains, although not enough to challenge Bjelke-Petersen's continued dominance. The Liberals were decimated, falling from 22 seats to a rump of eight seats. Of the Liberals who crossed the floor, only White and Innes were reelected.

|}

Seats changing hands

 Members listed in italics did not recontest their seats.
 Bob Moore was elected as a Liberal in the previous election, but changed to the National party in 1983.

Post-election pendulum

Aftermath

After the election, Bjelke-Petersen openly invited Liberal MLAs to defect to the Nationals.  On 25 October, two Liberal MLAs, Brian Austin (Wavell) and Don Lane (Merthyr) took up Bjelke-Petersen's offer and joined the Nationals.  This gave them 43 seats, a majority of two—the first time that the Nationals had governed in majority at any level in Australia.

This left only six Liberals, and marked the end of Terry White's leadership and Angus Innes' deputy leadership. Former leader Sir William Knox (Nundah) was returned to lead what remained of the party.

Labor had performed well, but not well enough, especially in North Queensland. Still, Labor strategists hoped that they had recovered enough seats to put them within striking distance of winning in 1986.

See also
Candidates of the Queensland state election, 1983

References

Elections in Queensland
1983 elections in Australia
1980s in Queensland
October 1983 events in Australia